Vicente Pérez Selfa (born 21 October 1997) is a Spanish motorcycle racer. He races in the FIM CEV Moto3 Junior World Championship aboard a KTM RC 250 GP.

Following the death of fellow Avintia Academy rider Andreas Pérez he switched his bike number to No. 77 as a tribute while also replacing Livio Loi in the Moto3 category.

Career statistics

Grand Prix motorcycle racing

By season

Races by year
(key) (Races in bold indicate pole position; races in italics indicate fastest lap)

References

External links

1997 births
Living people
Spanish motorcycle racers
Moto3 World Championship riders
People from Ribera Baixa
Sportspeople from the Province of Valencia
Supersport 300 World Championship riders